Bruno Miguel Boialvo Gaspar (born 21 April 1993) is a professional footballer who plays as a right-back for Vitória S.C. and the Angolan national team.

After starting out at Benfica's reserves, he went on to play 96 Primeira Liga matches in representation of Vitória de Guimarães and Sporting. He also played professionally in Italy with Fiorentina, in Greece with Olympiacos and in Canada with Vancouver Whitecaps FC.

Born in Portugal, Gaspar represented that country as a youth, before switching to Angola at senior level and playing at the 2019 Africa Cup of Nations.

Club career

Benfica
Born in Évora, Alto Alentejo Province, Gaspar joined S.L. Benfica's youth academy as a 12-year-old. He made his professional debut for their reserves on 6 January 2013, playing the full 90 minutes in a 1–1 away draw against C.D. Santa Clara as the visitors ended with nine players.

Gaspar scored his first goal as a senior – and in the Segunda Liga – on 15 February 2014, in a 2–0 home victory over S.C. Braga B. He finished the season with 24 appearances, helping the team finish in fifth place.

Vitória Guimarães
On 2 September 2014, Gaspar was loaned to Primeira Liga club Vitória de Guimarães. His first match in the competition occurred 12 days later, in a 1–1 home draw with FC Porto where he conceded a penalty after grabbing Yacine Brahimi in the penalty area. He, teammate Hernâni Fortes and opponent Salvador Agra were all sent off at the end of a goalless draw at Minho rivals S.C. Braga on 7 December.

For the 2015–16 campaign, the move was made permanent and the player signed a four-year contract.

Fiorentina
On 19 June 2017, Gaspar agreed to a five-year deal with ACF Fiorentina from Italy. His maiden Serie A appearance took place on 27 August, when he came on as 46th-minute substitute for Nenad Tomović and provided the assist to Milan Badelj in a 1–2 home loss against U.C. Sampdoria.

Sporting CP
Gaspar returned to his homeland and its capital in June 2018, signing for five seasons with Sporting CP. He scored his first goal for the club on 3 January 2019 (with collaboration from opposing player Vincent Sasso), in a 2–1 home victory over C.F. Os Belenenses.

On 31 August 2019, Olympiacos F.C. announced the acquisition of Gaspar on loan. On 9 March 2021, again on loan, he joined Vancouver Whitecaps FC of Major League Soccer with a purchase option at the end of the season, which was not activated; he scored once in his year in Canada, opening a 1–1 draw at the San Jose Earthquakes on 23 October.

Return to Vitória
Gaspar returned to Vitória Guimarães on the last day of the 2022 January transfer window (alongside Geny Catamo on loan), in a deal where Marcus Edwards moved in the opposite direction.

International career
Gaspar won his first and only cap for the Portuguese under-21 side on 13 November 2014, playing seven minutes in a 3–1 away friendly defeat against England. On 20 May 2019, he was pre-called up by Angola for the 2019 Africa Cup of Nations, making his debut on 8 June by featuring 29 minutes in a 2–0 friendly victory over Guinea-Bissau held in Penafiel.

Career statistics

Club

Honours
Sporting CP
Taça de Portugal: 2018–19
Taça da Liga: 2018–19

Olympiacos
Super League Greece: 2019–20
Greek Football Cup: 2019–20

References

External links
 
 
 

1993 births
Living people
People from Évora
Portuguese sportspeople of Angolan descent
Sportspeople from Évora District
Portuguese footballers
Angolan footballers
Association football defenders
Primeira Liga players
Liga Portugal 2 players
S.L. Benfica B players
Vitória S.C. players
Vitória S.C. B players
Sporting CP footballers
Serie A players
ACF Fiorentina players
Super League Greece players
Olympiacos F.C. players
Major League Soccer players
Vancouver Whitecaps FC players
Portugal youth international footballers
Portugal under-21 international footballers
Angola international footballers
2019 Africa Cup of Nations players
Portuguese expatriate footballers
Angolan expatriate footballers
Expatriate footballers in Italy
Expatriate footballers in Greece
Expatriate soccer players in Canada
Portuguese expatriate sportspeople in Italy
Portuguese expatriate sportspeople in Greece
Portuguese expatriate sportspeople in Canada
Angolan expatriate sportspeople in Greece
Angolan expatriate sportspeople in Canada